Consort He (died 18 May 1836), of the Manchu Plain White Banner Hoifa Nara clan, was a consort of the Daoguang Emperor.

Life

Family background
Consort He's personal name was not recorded in history. She was a Booi Aha of the Plain White Banner by birth.

 Father: Chengwen, served as a fifth rank literary official

Jiaqing era
It is not known when Lady Hoifa Nara became a lady-in-waiting of Minning, the second son of the Jiaqing Emperor. On 16 May 1808, she gave birth to his first son, Yiwei. In May 1808, she was elevated to his secondary consort.

Daoguang era
The Jiaqing Emperor died on 2 September 1820 and was succeeded by Minning, who was enthroned as the Daoguang Emperor. She resided in the Yanxi Palace. On 28 December 1822, Lady Hoifa Nara was granted the title "Concubine He". In December 1823, she was elevated to "Consort He". Even though her son Yiwei was the Daoguang Emperor's only son at some point, Consort He never rose above the rank of Consort. Five years after the death of Yiwei, she died on 18 May 1836 from kidney problems and was interred in the Mu Mausoleum of the Western Qing tombs.

Titles
 During the reign of the Qianlong Emperor (r. 1735–1796) or the Jiaqing Emperor (r. 1796–1820):
 Lady Hoifa Nara
 During the reign of the Jiaqing Emperor (r. 1796–1820):
 Lady-in-waiting
 Secondary consort (from May 1808)
 During the reign of the Daoguang Emperor (r. 1820–1850):
 Concubine He (from 28 December 1822), fifth rank consort
 Consort He (from December 1823), fourth rank consort

Issue
 As a lady-in-waiting:
 Yiwei (16 May 1808 – 23 May 1831), the Daoguang Emperor's first son

See also
 Ranks of imperial consorts in China#Qing
 Royal and noble ranks of the Qing dynasty

Notes

References
 

18th-century births
1836 deaths
Consorts of the Daoguang Emperor
Manchu people
Year of birth unknown